Manish Nawani is an Indian actor. He has acted in movies, tv series, advertisements for major brands, web series for ALT and APPLAUSE ENTERTAINMENT. He started his acting career with 12/24 Karol Bagh. He has also acted in The Buddy Project (season 2), Pukaar and Aahat (season 6). He worked in Gulmohar Grand.

Filmography

Films

Television

Web series

References

External links

1988 births
Living people
Indian male television actors
Male actors in Hindi television
Indian male film actors
Male actors from Delhi